Frank John Smykal (October 13, 1889 – August 11, 1950) was a shortstop in Major League Baseball. He played for the Pittsburgh Pirates.

References

External links

1889 births
1950 deaths
Major League Baseball shortstops
Pittsburgh Pirates players
Baseball players from Chicago
Lexington Colts players
Ottawa Senators (baseball) players
Fort Wayne Railroaders players
Warren Warriors players
Chattanooga Lookouts players